Wolftrap Farm was a historic home located near Smithfield, Isle of Wight County, Virginia. The house was built about 1820, and is a -story, three bay, Federal style frame dwelling. It was a one-story rear elevation surmounted by a double tier of dormer windows. The house has a double-pile, hall-parlor plan and measures approximately 32 feet, 6 inches, square.  The house has been dismantled.

It was listed on the National Register of Historic Places in 1974, and was delisted in 2017

References

Houses on the National Register of Historic Places in Virginia
Federal architecture in Virginia
Houses completed in 1820
Houses in Isle of Wight County, Virginia
National Register of Historic Places in Isle of Wight County, Virginia
Former National Register of Historic Places in Virginia